"700 Ft. Ceiling" is a song by Canadian rock group The Tragically Hip. It was released in October 1996 as the third single from their fifth studio album, Trouble at the Henhouse. The song peaked at number 22 on Canada's RPM Singles Chart.

Charts

References

1996 singles
The Tragically Hip songs
1996 songs
MCA Records singles